Bartolommeo Coriolano (1590 or 1599–1676, pronunciation ko-ree-o-lă'no and sometimes spelled Coriolanus) was an Italian engraver during the Baroque period. His father, Cristoforo Coriolano, and brother, Giovanni Battista Coriolano were also woodblock printers, although there is some doubt over the actual relationship between Cristoforo and Bartolommeo Coriolano. Coriolano had a daughter, Teresa Maria Coriolano, who later became a painter and engraver.

Coriolano trained under the painter Guido Reni and modeled many of his woodblock prints on the work of his teacher, as was common. Coriolano was a traditional woodblock printer who followed the German style in printing. He was successful and popular, though not an innovator in the technique of woodblock printing. Eventually, he came to the attention of Pope Urban VII who granted Coriolano knighthood, as a "Roman count", and a pension. Coriolano's works are the most celebrated of the works produced by the Coriolano family.

Biography
Coriolano was born in Bologna in either 1590 or 1599, the son of Cristoforo Coriolano. He, like his brother Giambattista (born 1595 or 1589 and died 8 January 1649) became wood engravers like their father. Originally from Nuremberg, their father had moved to Venice and changed the family name to Lederer. His father died at Venice in 1600. With such a distance between Coriolano's first work, 1627, and the death of his father, the relationship of father and son is questionable. This is compounded by his father's career with Giorgio Vasari in 1568, making his father of a considerable age when Coriolano was born.

He was first instructed by his father at the Academy of the Incamminati, of the Carracci, at Bologna. He afterwards became a pupil of Reni, in whose studio he learned wood-engraving. After the successful woodblock printer Andrea Andreani died, Coriolano took his place. He worked at Bologna from 1630 to 1647, and was fond of developing the designs of Reni and Guercino.

His success at imitating Reni brought him to the attention of Pope Urban VIII. A set of his prints after Carracci, Reni, and others was dedicated to Urban VIII, and Coriolano provided the pope with a print of the Madonna; the pope granted him a salary and brought Coriolano into the Knighthood of Loreto (with the title Cavaliere di Loreto). During this time, he called himself Romanus Eques, "Roman knight", which refers to his knighthood. Coriolano had a daughter, Theresa Maria Coriolano, who was also an engraver and painter.

Works
Coriolano's artistic works are the most celebrated works by the members of the Coriolano family, and his works date from 1627 to 1647. He, like his brother, was an Italian chiaroscurist that would use two blocks for their prints in a German manner. His style was close to the German use of black for outlines and brown for the tints. He usually made use of two blocks for his woodcuts; on one he cut the outline and the dark shadows, like the hatchings of a pen, and on the other block the demi-tinte, or "halftones". Coriolano's prints brought great recognition even though he contributed nothing new to the technique that he used.

Many artists during Coriolano's time relied on aspects of Reni's works, his style or his actual designs, in producing their own work. Coriolano, in particular, would base many of his woodcut designs on Reni's works. An example of this is Coriolano's Salome with the Head of the Baptist (1631). His major works include St Jerome in Meditation Before a Crucifix, Herodias with the Head of the Baptist, and The Virgin, with the Infant Sleeping. Other important works by Coriolano include The Fall of Giants (1638), a four sheet work that is 32 inches by 23 inches, The Four Sibyls, Peace and Abundance (1642), Jupiter Hurling Bolts at the Giants (1647) and The Seven Ages.

His work is held in many museums worldwide:

Notes

References
 Bryan, Michael. Dictionary of Painters and Engravers, Biographical and Critical Volume I: A–K. London: George Bell and Sons, 1886.
 Chatto, William and Jackson, John. A Treatise on Wood Engraving. Detroit: Gale Research, 1969.
 Eaton, Walter and Ruzicka, Rudolph. New York: A Series of Wood Engravings in Colour.  New York: The Grolier Club, 1915.
 Giffiths, Ralph (ed.) "Rogers's Collections of Prints. The Monthly Review. Volume LX, 1779.
 Kainen, Jacob. John Baptist Jackson: 18th-Century Master of the Color Woodcut. Echo Library, 2008.
 McClintock, John and Strong, James. Cyclopædia of Biblical, Theological, and Ecclesiastical Literature. New York, Arno Press, 1969.
 Society for the Diffusion of Useful Knowledge (SDUK). Penny Cyclopaedia of the Society for the Diffusion of Useful Knowledge. London: Charles Knight, 1851.
 Spear, Richard. The "Divine" Guido. New Haven: Yale University Press, 1997.
 Thomas, Joseph. Universal Pronouncing Dictionary of Biography and Mythology'' Vol I. Philadelphia: J. B. Lippincott, 1915.

1599 births
1676 deaths
Papal counts
Italian engravers
Italian Baroque painters
17th-century Italian painters
Painters from Bologna
17th-century engravers
Catholic engravers